The 2009 season is the Newcastle Jets' second season of football (soccer) in Australia's women's league, the W-League.

Season 2 - 2009

Fixtures
The season will be played over 10 rounds, followed by a finals series.

Standings

Players

Player Movement

In
 Loren Mahoney (Sydney FC)
 Bronte Bates
 Kate Hensman
 Hayley Crawford
 Carlie Ikonomou
 Emma Stewart (Central Coast Mariners)
 Caitlyn Jarvie
 Madeline Searl
 Tara Andrews
 Emma-Kate Dewhurst (Central Coast Mariners)

Out
 Samantha Wood
 Cheryl Salisbury
 Rhali Dobson
 Joanne Peters
 Kate Gill
 Gemma O'Toole
 Emily van Egmond (Canberra United)
 Harmonie Attwill
 Rebecca Smith
 Sanna Frostevall
 Brianna Davey
 Taleah Doyle
 Courtney Miller

Squad statistics
Last updated 10 October 2009

Records
First game = 0-0 draw V Adelaide United
Largest win = 
Largest loss =

References

2009
Newcastle Jets